Volokolamsky District is an administrative and municipal district (raion), one of the thirty-six in Moscow Oblast, Russia. It is located in the west of the oblast and borders with Mozhaysky District in the south, Shakhovskoy District in the west, Lotoshinsky District in the northwest, Klinsky District in the northeast, and with Istrinsky and Ruzsky Districts in the east. Its administrative center is the town of Volokolamsk. Population: 53,244 (2010 Census);  The population of Volokolamsk accounts for 44.0% of the district's total population.

Geography
Forests cover about 40% of the district's territory. Main rivers include the Ruza and the Lama.

History
The district was established in 1929 and its territory was significantly expanded in 1957.

Attractions

References

Notes

Sources

Districts of Moscow Oblast